Joseph R. Lenehan (1916 – 6 December 1981) was an Irish politician and publican. Lenehan first stood for election as a Fine Gael candidate at the 1944 general election but was not elected. He was also an unsuccessful candidate at the 1951 general election.

He was elected to Dáil Éireann as an independent Teachta Dála (TD) for the Mayo North constituency at the 1961 general election. He lost his seat at the 1965 general election but was subsequently nominated by the Taoiseach to the 11th Seanad. He was elected as a Fianna Fáil TD for the Mayo West constituency at the 1969 general election. He lost his seat at the 1973 general election.

References

1916 births
1981 deaths
Fine Gael politicians
Independent TDs
Fianna Fáil TDs
Members of the 17th Dáil
Members of the 11th Seanad
Members of the 19th Dáil
Politicians from County Mayo
Nominated members of Seanad Éireann
Fianna Fáil senators